Laurel Edwards (born 1 October 1966)  is an Australian television presenter, radio announcer and singer.

Career 
Edwards' radio career began in 1992, commencing work at Brisbane radio station 4KQ, where she remained until 2022.  In 2005, Edwards was named as Brisbane's longest serving female breakfast radio presenter.  4KQ marked Edwards' 25th anniversary with the station in 2017.

Edwards' first television job was hosting Nine Network children's program OK for Kids in 1987.  she was a presenter on Seven Network travel show The Great Day Out.  She is the sole remaining original presenter on the show, having been with the program since it was launched as The Great South East in 1997.

Personal life 
Edwards met Troy Cassar-Daley at the Gympie Music Muster in 1993, and they married in 1996.  They have two children, Clay and Jem, and celebrated 20 years of marriage in 2016.  Clay is a radio presenter with Brisbane Indigenous station 98.9 FM where he co-presents the Dunn & Daley Show with Jamie Dunn. Jem Cassar-Daley is a singer-songwriter.

References 

1966 births
Living people